Genes to Cells is a peer-reviewed scientific journal that publishes original research on the molecular mechanisms of biological events. The journal has been published since 1996 by Wiley-Blackwell on behalf of the Molecular Biology Society of Japan.

Indexing
Genes to Cells is indexed in:

References

External links
Journal homepage at publisher site
Molecular Biology Society of Japan

Biology journals
Academic journals associated with learned and professional societies
Monthly journals